Rudolf Vatinyan (12 May 1941 – 2 January 2021) was an Armenian cinematographer. 

He was born in Dilijan, Armenia. In 1969, he graduated from the Gerasimov Institute of Cinematography (VGIK) (B.Volchek's master-class). He worked at Armenfilm studio from 1970 until his death, and had been lecturing in the Department of Culture of Yerevan State Pedagogical Institute since 1980, and since 1994 in the Institute of Cinema and Theatre.

Filmography

 2009 – Border
 2000 – A Merry Bas
 1999 – New Adventures of Kind Ghosts (animation)
 1997 – Presence (documentary)
 1996-97 – God Have Mercy
 1995 – Where Are You Going? (documentary)
 1995 – Parajanov. The Last Collage (documentary)
 1993 – Finish
 1993 – Bust (short)
 1991 – Hostages
 1988 – Breath
 1986 – As Long as We Live…
 1985 – Where are You Going, Soldier?
 1985 – Passport of Immortality (documentary)
 1985 – The Tango of Our Childhood
 1983 – Fire Sparkling in the Night
 1982 – Song of the Old Days
 1982 – A Happening in July (short)
 1981 – Business Trip to Sanatorium
 1980 – Automobile on the Roof
 1979 – Die on the Horse
 1978 – Five More Days
 1977 – Cooks Arrived for Competition
 1976 – August
 1975 – This Green, Red World
 1975 – Ginger Plane
 1974 – Yellow Tonir (short)
 1973 – Ceaseless Colors (documentary)
 1972 – From Two to Eight (documentary)
 1972 – Armenian Murals
 1970 – Photography (short)

External links 
 

Armenian cinematographers
1941 births
People from Tavush Province
2021 deaths